William V. Ranous (March 12, 1857 – April 1, 1915) was an American silent film actor and director and Shakespearean stage actor.

Biography
William V. Ranous was born in New York State on March 12, 1857. He married writer and translator Dora Knowlton on May 28, 1881; he later married actress Inez Marcel.

Ranous appeared in 54 films between 1907 and 1915. He also directed 28 films between 1907 and 1913. He was the first director at Vitagraph Studios and also directed Hiawatha (1909), the first film produced by Carl Laemmle's Independent Moving Pictures Company. On Broadway, Ranous appeared in Quo Vadis (1900) and Romeo and Juliet (1903).

He died in Santa Monica on April 1, 1915.

Selected filmography
 Macbeth (1908)
 Skinner's Finish (1908)
 Les Misérables (1909)

References

External links

1857 births
1915 deaths
20th-century American male actors
American male film actors
American male silent film actors
American film directors
Male actors from New York (state)
Male Shakespearean actors